Fontein is a Dutch toponymic surname meaning "fountain" in modern Dutch, presumably originating with people living near a fountain, source or well. Common spelling variants are Fonteijn, Fonteyn, Fontijn and Fontyn, each pronounced  in Dutch. People with this surname include:

 (1526–1661), Flemish-born Dutch painter
Andrew Fontein (born 1990), American soccer goalkeeper
George Salto Fontein (1890–1963), Dutch chess master
 (born 1943), Flemish journalist
Jacqueline Fontyn (born 1930), Belgian composer, pianist and music educator
Jan Fontein (1927–2007), Dutch art historian and museum director
Maarten Fontein (born 1952), Dutch football club director
Margot Fonteyn, stage name of Margaret Evelyn de Arias (1919–1991), English ballerina
Mathieu Fonteyn (born 1985), Belgian swimmer
Nouchka Fontijn (born 1987), Dutch boxer,  European champion in women's middleweight
Pieter Fontijn (1773–1839), Dutch portrait and miniature painter and drawer
Sam Fonteyn (born Samuel Soden, c. 1925–1991), English composer-pianist

See also
, a cave in Arikok National Park, Aruba

References

Dutch-language surnames
Dutch toponymic surnames